Clifford the Big Red Dog is an American children's book series about the adventures of a precocious girl named Emily Elizabeth and her titular pet: a giant, red-furred dog named Clifford. It was first published in 1963 and was written by Norman Bridwell. Clifford is Scholastic's official mascot.

Characters 
 Clifford is a 2-year-old male red dog whose appearance, disposition and behavior are based on a giant dog. His size is inconsistent: While he is often shown being about 25 feet (7.5 m) tall from paws to head, Clifford can appear far larger. The character's name is based on the imaginary childhood friend of Norman Bridwell's wife, Norma Bridwell. Bridwell originally wanted to name the dog "Tiny", but his wife persuaded him that "Clifford" was better. Clifford's pet owner is Emily Elizabeth.  Clifford has a mother, two brothers, and two sisters, all of whom are normal-sized dogs.  Clifford was originally the runt of the litter, seemingly fated to be small and sick, but grew to an enormous size apparently due to Emily Elizabeth's love and care. Clifford's character was created when a Harper & Row editor advised Bridwell to write a story to go along with one of his pictures. Bridwell recalls she picked out his sketch of a baby girl with a horse-sized bloodhound, and casually said, "There might be a story in this" because there always was one.
 Emily Elizabeth is Clifford's owner and human friend, an 8-year-old girl. She is frequently portrayed riding him like a horse. She was named for creator Norman Bridwell's daughter and based on the imaginary adventures of Bridwell's wife. The TV series adaptation gives her a surname, Emily Elizabeth Howard, and changes the background, with her receiving Clifford as a surprise present on her 6th birthday instead of picking him out as a Christmas present.

List of books

Adaptations

Videos
Karl-Lorimar Home Video released the video Clifford's Sing Along Adventure around 1986. Warner Home Video re-released it in the mid-1990s.

In 1988, Scholastic Studios, Nelvana Limited, and Family Home Entertainment released Clifford's Fun with..., a videotape series with a theme song composed by Phillip Namanworth and Benjamin Goldstein. The episodes on the release are: "The ABC Message Service", "Clifford's Birthday Surprise", "The Scavenger Hunt", "The Rhyme Cat Rescue", "Clifford Goes to Hollywood", and "The Pet Show". Musician Brent Titcomb was the voice of Clifford, and actress Alyson Court was the voice of Emily Elizabeth. In the late 1990s, a television station in Spain aired the direct-to-video series for a short period of time.

Television

Scholastic Media produced a 65-episode adaptation shown on PBS Kids, which aired from September 2000 to February 2003. Clifford was voiced by John Ritter, and Emily Elizabeth was voiced by Grey DeLisle. There was also a 39-episode prequel series that took place during Clifford's puppyhood, which ran from September 2003 to February 2006, with Lara Jill Miller as the voice of Young Clifford. During that time, a theatrical film which served as the show's finale was released in February 2004 and no new episodes were released after John Ritter's death. However, a new series was released on December 6, 2019 for Amazon Prime Video and December 7, 2019 on PBS Kids with Adam Sanders and Hannah Levinson as the new voices of Clifford and Emily Elizabeth respectively. They are returning on CBC Kids and CBBC and TG4.

Live-action film adaptation

In May 2012, it was reported that Universal Pictures and Illumination Entertainment would make a live-action/CGI animated feature film based on the book. Matt Lopez had been hired to write the script, while Chris Meledandri and Deborah Forte would produce the film. In July 2013, it was reported that Illumination had dropped the project. Two months later, it was reported that the film was still in development at Universal and that there were negotiations to have David Bowers direct the film. Like the 2011 film Hop, Clifford the Big Red Dog will be animated while the other characters will be live-action. On August 1, 2014, Universal scheduled the film for a release on April 8, 2016. In the beginning of 2015, the film's release date was taken over by another Universal film, The Boss. On June 30, 2016, it was reported by Deadline Hollywood that Paramount Pictures had picked up the rights for the film. According to the report, "Forte decided to take the material in a new direction," and "Universal let the option lapse." It was further announced that Justin Malen was hired to write the screenplay. On September 25, 2017, it was announced that Walt Becker would direct the film, replacing Bowers. The film is now produced by Scholastic Entertainment and Paramount Animation. On February 27, 2019, Paramount set the film for a November 13, 2020 release, taking over the slot for the cancelled live-action/CGI Rugrats film. The film features child actress Darby Camp as Emily Elizabeth and Jack Whitehall as a new character, Uncle Casey, in their starring roles, with Tony Hale as Zac Tieran, the main villain of the film. On August 28, 2020, the film release was pushed back to November 5, 2021 due to the COVID-19 pandemic. On November 25, 2020, a 20-second teaser trailer from the feature film was released. Then, on May 26, 2021, the film was rescheduled to be released on September 17, 2021, but the film was pulled from the release schedule due to the rise of the Delta variant. Although it was surprisingly screened at CinemaCon on August 26, 2021, it was later announced that the film would be released theatrically and digitally on Paramount+ on November 10, 2021.

Video games

Original series (2000)
Clifford's Reading
Clifford's Thinking Games

Modern series

Clifford's Learning Activities (2001)
Clifford's Musical Memory Games (2002)
Clifford's Phonics (2003)
Clifford's Big Puzzle Game (A Wendy's Kids' Meal DVD game)

References
 Media and Culture, 5th ed., Richard Campbell, Christopher R. Martin and Bettina Fabos.

External links 
 Official site of book series
 Clifford | PBS Kids
 Clifford's creation

 
Book series introduced in 1963
Series of children's books
American picture books
Scholastic franchises
Scholastic Corporation books
Books about dogs
Fiction about giants
Fiction about size change
Children's books about friendship
Children's books adapted into television shows
Children's books adapted into films